WKAO (91.1 FM) is a Christian Adult Contemporary–formatted radio station licensed to Ashland, Kentucky, United States, and serving the greater Huntington–Ashland metropolitan area. The station is owned by Positive Alternative Radio and maintains studios on Lester Lane in Cannonsburg, Kentucky. WKAO's transmitter facilties are located next to Rotary Park in eastern Huntington, West Virginia. WKAO and the Walk FM franchise are relayed across four full-power FM stations, one FM translator, and one AM station.

References

External links
WKAO's website
 

KAO
Ashland, Kentucky